Edward Eli Juran (November 5, 1902 – June 19, 1955) was an American baseball first baseman and pitcher in the Negro leagues. He played from 1923 to 1932 with the Birmingham Black Barons, Newark Stars, Washington Pilots, Hilldale Club, and Baltimore Black Sox. He played under the name "Eddie Durant" in the 1930s. His brother, Johnny Juran, also played with the Black Barons in 1923 and 1924.

References

External links
 and Baseball-Reference Black Baseball stats and Seamheads

Birmingham Black Barons players
Newark Stars players
Washington Pilots players
Hilldale Club players
Baltimore Black Sox players
1902 births
1955 deaths
20th-century African-American sportspeople
Baseball pitchers